Værnes is an area in the municipality of Stjørdal in Trøndelag county, Norway. The village of Hell/Lånke lie to the south, and the village of Prestmoen lies to the east.

The area is the site of Trondheim Airport, Værnes, Trondheim Airport Station, Værnes Air Station, and Værnes Church.

References

Villages in Trøndelag
Stjørdal